The 2008 Africa Cup of Nations, also known as the MTN Africa Cup of Nations due to the competition's sponsorship by MTN, was the 26th edition of the Africa Cup of Nations, the biennial football tournament for nations affiliated to the Confederation of African Football (CAF). The tournament was staged at four venues around Ghana between 20 January and 10 February 2008. This was the last Africa Cup of Nations to use the old CAF logo.

Egypt won the tournament, beating Cameroon 1–0 in the final. As winners, they qualified for the 2009 FIFA Confederations Cup as the CAF representatives.

Host selection 
Bids:
 Ghana
 Libya
 South Africa

The organization of the 2008 Africa Cup of Nations was awarded to Ghana on 8 July 2004 by the CAF Executive Committee members which are 12 in Cairo, Egypt. Voters had a choice between Ghana and Libya which was disadvantaged by the fact that two countries in the North Africa region had already hosted the last two editions (Tunisia in 2004, and Egypt in 2006).

South Africa, also was a candidate at the start, eventually withdrew in May 2004 after being nominated for the organization of the 2010 FIFA World Cup.

This is the fourth time that Ghana has hosted the African Cup after 1963, 1978 and 2000 (jointly with Nigeria).

Venues

Squads

Qualification 

The entrants were divided into 12 groups. All group winners and the best three runners-up from groups with four teams (groups 2-11) qualified for the finals. Host Ghana qualified automatically. Qualifying took place between 2 September 2006 and 13 October 2007.

Teams 

  – Host, 16th appearance (4 titles)
  – Group 1 winner, 17th appearance (1 title)
  – Group 2 winner, 21st appearance (5 titles)
  – Group 3 winner, 15th appearance (2 titles)
  – Group 4 winner, 7th appearance (1 title)
  – Group 5 winner, 15th appearance (4 titles)
  – Group 6 winner, 4th appearance
  – Group 7 winner, 11th appearance
  – Group 8 winner, 9th appearance
  – Group 9 winner, 5th appearance
  – Group 10 winner, 2nd appearance
  – Group 11 winner, 13th appearance
  – Group 12 winner, 13th appearance (1 title)
  – Group 4 runner-up, 13th appearance (1 title)
  – Group 9 runner-up, 2nd appearance
  – Group 11 runner-up, 7th appearance (1 title)

Match officials 
16 referees and 16 assistant referees were selected for the tournament, including two from Japan and one from South Korea.

Seeding and grouping procedure 
The draw for the tournament took place on 19 October 2007. The sixteen teams were divided into four pots according to their performances in past Cup of Nations tournaments. Ghana, as host, were automatically seeded as the top team in Group A. Egypt, the defending champions, were seeded as the top team in Group C. Each group consists of four teams, one drawn from each of the pots.

 Pot 1: Ghana (Group A), Egypt (Group C), Nigeria, Tunisia
 Pot 2: Cameroon, Ivory Coast, Morocco, Senegal
 Pot 3: Guinea, Mali, South Africa, Zambia
 Pot 4: Angola, Benin, Namibia, Sudan

Tournament ball 

During the previous editions of the Africa Cup of Nations, the ball used was not a ball especially made for the tournament. As the tournament was held on even years, the same years big tournaments such as the UEFA European Championships or the FIFA World Cup were held, the official ball for the tournament held this year was used for the African Cup of Nations: the Adidas Roteiro in 2004, or the Adidas Teamgeist in 2006. However, for the 2008 tournament, Adidas made a special ball, clearly different from the Adidas Europass going to be used five months later for the Euro. The ball was named Wawa Aba and was designed to include host nation Ghana's red, yellow and green. The ball was later used for the other African competitions.

For the Akan culture originating from Western Africa, one of the Adinkra symbols named Wawa Aba is a symbol of hardiness, toughness, and perseverance. People there particularly believe in the strength and team spirit of a community. The Wawa Aba literally means "seed(s) of Wawa tree (Triplochiton scleroxylon)”, one of the strongest and most processible woods of Africa and whose seeds are very hard. For the population, the Wawa Aba mainly has mystical significance. These are people who don't let failure discourage them, who seize all opportunities successfully and who are thus just as strong and adaptable as the Wawa Aba.

Group stage

Tie-breaking criteria 
Where two or more teams end the group stage with the same number of points, their ranking is determined by the following criteria:
 points earned in the matches between the teams concerned;
 goal difference in the matches between the teams concerned;
 number of goals scored in the group matches between the teams concerned;
 goal difference in all group matches;
 number of goals scored in all group matches;
 drawing of lots by the organizing committee.

All times given as local time (UTC+0)

Group A

Group B

Group C

Group D

Knockout stage

Quarter-finals

Semi-finals

Third place match

Final

Awards

Player of the tournament 
  Hosny Abd Rabo

Top scorer 
  Samuel Eto'o – 5 goals

Best Goalkeeper 
  Essam El-Hadary

Best XI 
The following players were selected as the best in their respective positions, based on their performances throughout the tournament. Their performances were analysed by the tournament's Technical Study Group (TSG), who picked the team.

Substitutes
  Richard Kingson
  Hany Said
  Ahmed Fathy
  Frej Saber
  Stéphane Mbia
  Didier Drogba
  Kader Keïta

Goalscorers 
5 goals
  Samuel Eto'o

4 goals

  Manucho
  Hosny Abd Rabo
  Mohamed Aboutrika
  Amr Zaki

3 goals

  Didier Drogba
  Salomon Kalou
  Kader Keïta
  Boubacar Sanogo
  Junior Agogo
  Sulley Muntari
  Soufiane Alloudi

2 goals

  Geremi
  Joseph-Désiré Job
  Stéphane Mbia
  Mohamed Zidan
  Michael Essien
  Pascal Feindouno
  Brian Brendell
  Yakubu
  Elrio van Heerden
  Chaouki Ben Saada
  Francileudo dos Santos
  Chris Katongo

1 goal

  Flávio
  Razak Omotoyossi
  Achille Emana
  Alain N'Kong
  Aruna Dindane
  Bakari Koné
  Yaya Touré
  Marco Zoro
  Ahmed Fathy
  Haminu Dramani
  Asamoah Gyan
  Quincy Owusu-Abeyie
  Ismaël Bangoura
  Oumar Kalabane
  Souleymane Youla
  Frédéric Kanouté
  Hicham Aboucherouane
  Abdeslam Ouaddou
  Tarik Sektioui
  Monsef Zerka
  Mikel John Obi
  Moustapha Bayal Sall
  Henri Camara
  Abdoulaye Diagne-Faye
  Diomansy Kamara
  Katlego Mphela
  Yassine Chikhaoui
  Issam Jemâa
  Mejdi Traoui
  James Chamanga
  Felix Katongo
  Jacob Mulenga

Own goals
  Mohammed Ali El Khider (playing against Cameroon)

References

External links 

 2008 African Cup of Nations at CAFonline.com
 Africa Cup of Nations on BBC 1Xtra
 African Cup of Nations 2008 coverage on Reuters.co.uk

 
Africa Cup of Nations tournaments
International association football competitions hosted by Ghana
2007–08 in Ghanaian football
Africa Cup of Nations 2008
Nations
January 2008 sports events in Africa
February 2008 sports events in Africa